Gabriela Dabrowski and Alla Kudryavtseva were the defending champions, but Kudryavtseva decided not to participate. Dabrowski partnered with Maria Sanchez but lost in the first round.

Second seeds Marta Domachowska and Andrea Hlaváčková won the title, defeating Françoise Abanda and Victoria Duval in the final, 7–5, 6–3.

Seeds

Draw

References 
 Draw

Challenger Banque Nationale de Saguenay
Challenger de Saguenay